Evolution in Variable Environment (EVE) is a computer program designed to simulate microbial cellular behavior in various environments. The prediction of cellular responses is a rapidly evolving topic in systems biology and computational biology. The goal is to predict the behavior a particular organism in response to a set of environmental stimuli in silico. Such predictions can have a significant impact on preventive medicine, biotechnology, and microbe re-engineering. Computational prediction of behavior has two major components: the integration and simulation of vast biological networks and the creation of external stimuli.  Current limitations of the method are: lack of comprehensive experimental data on the various cellular subsystems and inadequate computational algorithms.

Overview
An organism that learns to modulate its behavior and gene expression based on temporal interrelationships between environmental factors possesses a competitive advantage of over other organisms that are unable to make such predictions. For example, learning when nutrients are going to be present in the environment allows the organism to selectively express genes that will take up the food source, thus allowing the organism to harvest energy.

Modeling these type of behaviors of even simple bacteria poses certain challenges. Given the diversity of biological systems, it would appear that the number of behavior responses to an environmental change would be nearly infinite. However, recent studies have shown that biological systems are optimized for a certain environment and will thus respond relatively specific ways to stimuli. This specificity simplifies the computations considerably.

The second challenge is the seemingly random environmental events. Ruling out circadian or temporal cycles, such as daytime versus nighttime or the different seasons, many events in the environment are unpredictable, such as weather patterns, water salinity, and oxygen levels. However, it turns out that certain environmental factors are coupled temporally. For example, an increase in water temperature is frequently correlated with an increase in water salinity. These relationships allow organisms to respond to specific environmental factors in a timely manner and thus increase their biological fitness.

The prediction of cellular responses bears considerable interest to scientists, physicians, and bio-engineers alike. For example, studying how a particular organism responds to external and internal stimuli can yield insights into the mechanisms of evolution. At the same time, such knowledge can also help physicians and health officials understand the infectious cycles of disease-causing bacteria and protists, allowing to them to establish preventive measures. Finally, knowing how bacteria behave under different stimuli may facilitate the development of engineered bacteria that perform certain functions, such as clearing oil spills.  These examples are only some of the many applications of predicting behaviors.

Program components

Cellular model
With the rapid expansion of human understanding of cell, molecular, and chemical biology, a vast set of data has been generated on the metabolic pathways, signal-transductional pathways, and gene regulatory networks. Cellular modeling attempts to analyze and visualize these pathways with the help of computers. A substantial portion of EVE is devoted to writing algorithms, data structures, and visualization tools for these biological systems.

Environmental model
The frequency of occurrence of environmental factors exists between two extremes: the completely periodic events and completely random events. Certain events, when viewed in isolation, appear completely random. However, then taken in conjunction with another event, these events can appear highly “predictable.” Such relationships can exist at multiple time scales, which reflect the highly structural habitats of free-living organisms. EVE attempts to model these intermediate events.

Computational framework
Most cellular models have been based on unicellular microbes. Since these simple organisms lack a complex neural network, computational modeling focuses on the various biochemical pathways of the cells, such as transcription, translation, post-translational modification, and protein-protein interactions. A variety of algorithms and programs exist that attempt to model these type of interactions.

Program overview
EVE is a simulation framework that is able to model predictive internal models around of complex environments. EVE operates under the “central dogma,” the assumption that all biochemical pathways proceed through the following steps: DNA => RNA => protein. Furthermore, the biochemical networks evolve in an asynchronous and stochastic manner. These two assumptions allow for the simulation of temporal dynamics of cascades of biochemical interactions/transformations.

Building upon previous attempts to simulate cellular behavior, such as circadian rhythms, EVE, according to its makers,  “integrates many features that improve the biochemical, evolutionary, and ecological realism of our simulations, features that are crucial for simulating microbial regulatory networks in the context of interactions with the environment.” The program takes into account all the molecular species and their interactions, including but limited to RNA, mRNA, and proteins. Each component is represented by a so-called node, which contains simulates biological parameters, such as basal expression, degradation, and regulatory strength. The program links these network of nodes together and simulates the interactions between the individual nodes.

Each response pathway is modeled to have a high energetic cost. The artificial organism takes in energy in form of “food” from the surroundings, while each interaction pathway expends high levels of energy. This setup generates a selection pressure that favors energy minimization.

Cells in silico are placed into this computational ecology and allowed to compete with each other for resources. The distribution of resources is set in a temporal dependent manner. During each round, random mutations and perturbations are introduced to the biochemical pathways. At the end of each round, the cells with the lowest energy count are eliminated. This selects for cells that are able to maximize energy uptake by optimizing the expression of its pathways in a particular time period.

Program features

Generation-based simulator
A fixed size population receives a pre-defined “energy packet.” At a given point during the simulation, the pathways of the cell undergo mutations and the properties of each node are updated. After the end of one round, the cells are selected based on a probability that is directly proportional to their acquired energy.

Real-time simulator
Similar to the generation-based simulator, cells receive a predefined energy packet at the beginning of the simulation. At any given point of the experiment, however, the cells can mutate or die.

Different types of simulations
Based on the selection pressure, the different simulations were categorized into the following groups:
- Delayed Gates: Signals and resource are related by OR, AND, XOR, NAND, NOR dynamic logic functions.
- Multi-gates: Signals and resource are interchangeably related by combinations of OR, AND, XOR, NAND, NOR dynamic logic functions.
-Oscillators: Selection pressure to evolve oscillatory expression of RP1 with or without a periodic guiding signal.
- Bi-stable switches: Selection pressure to evolve bi-stability in environments where two environmental signals operate as ON/OFF pulse switches.
-Duration/variance locking: Selection pressure to evolve networks that predict the duration of an Environmental resource that has fluctuating duration or phase variance.

Prediction results
After a few thousand generations, the simulation produced organisms that were able to predict their “mealtimes” based on temporally linked environmental cues. This pattern of evolution repeated itself for every type of the aforementioned simulations performed. The results from this study prompted scientists to experimentally reprogram E. coli cells in vivo. Normally, E. coli switches to anaerobic respiration when encountered with a significant temperature change. However, following the principles of the simulation, scientists were able to make the bacteria turn on aerobic respiration when exposed to higher temperatures. These experiments show how such simulations can yield important insights into a bacterium’s cellular response pathways.

Disadvantages
Simulations take a large amount of computing power and time. The EVE framework used multi-node supercomputer clusters (BlueGene/L and Beowulf) that ran for an average of 500 node workload for over 2 years in simulation of E. coli.
Possessing the correct amount of data is essential for the success of the program. Since the program integrates information on known pathways and interactions, these types of simulations are only useful for organism whose essential biochemical pathways have largely been elucidated.

References

External links
 Tavazoie Lab at Princeton University

Models of computation